Steinstücken (literally "Stone Pieces"), a small settlement with approximately 200 inhabitants, is the southernmost territory of the Berlin borough of Steglitz-Zehlendorf, belonging to Wannsee. From the division of Germany in 1949 until a connecting corridor was created in 1971–72, Steinstücken was the only permanently inhabited of twelve original exclaves of West Berlin in East Germany, while West Berlin itself was an enclave controlled by the Western Allies, surrounded either by East Berlin or East German (GDR) territory.

Origin of the exclave
Steinstücken is located on farmland that once belonged to the village of Wendisch Stahnsdorf, which had probably already been abandoned by the time it was mentioned in the list of villages, towns, and cities commissioned in 1375 by Emperor Charles IV. The exclave originated in 1787, when farmers of the nearby village of Stolpe acquired  of land outside of their municipality, which included part of the Potsdam Forest. A small settlement was established here in 1817 and was called Steinstücken after a piece of village land where rocks from the ice age had once been found. In 1898 Stolpe joined the new rural community of Wannsee. When Wannsee became part of the Zehlendorf borough with the incorporation of "Greater Berlin" in 1920, Steinstücken (with the exception of the Potsdam Forest section) came with it, although it was not physically connected to the city. Until 1945 this fact was of little significance; daily life was oriented towards Babelsberg, a district of Potsdam, where Steinstücken is located.

Cold War
At the end of World War II in 1945, West Berlin's city boundary became the dividing line between the Soviet zone of Germany and the American, British and French sectors of Berlin. For the first couple of years, the border still remained open.

An escalation of the Cold War (the Berlin Blockade and the proclamation of two separate German states) turned Berlin's outer boundary into a part of the Iron Curtain, and thus Steinstücken into an island of West Berlin, itself an island, in East Germany.

In 1951, the GDR attempted to annex Steinstücken by sending police and military forces into the exclave. After objection by the United States, they withdrew their forces a few days later. After this event, access of the inhabitants into surrounding East Germany was prohibited. From then on their only access to the outside world was through two East German checkpoints and a road of about 1 km length into West Berlin proper. For all their everyday activities (e.g. work, school, shopping, visits of friends and relatives) they had to pass these controls from then on.

After the building of the Berlin Wall in 1961, Steinstücken became the focus of several escape attempts; as a tiny exclave within East German territory it was demarcated only by barbed wire barriers.  After more than twenty East German border guards escaped to the west through Steinstücken, the communist regime in East Germany built a wall around Steinstücken to cut off this escape route.

Following a visit by Lucius D. Clay on September 21, 1961, by helicopter, a US military post was installed in the exclave. Soldiers were regularly flown in by helicopter from then on. Today, a "helicopter memorial" commemorates these circumstances.

The corridor

To eliminate this threat and alleviate this enormous inconvenience to the residents of Steinstücken, a road connecting the settlement to Kohlhasenbrück in West Berlin was built in 1972.  This required an exchange of territory between East Germany and West Berlin, which in turn required the approval of the four occupation powers: the Soviet Union, United States, United Kingdom, and France.  Following meetings of the Allied Commission, the four powers signed the Four Power Agreement on Berlin on September 3, 1971, which led to a tiny sliver of land connecting West Berlin to Steinstücken becoming part of West Berlin territory.

In return West Berlin ceded six uninhabited exclaves to East Germany and paid four million West German Deutsche Marks. The connecting road, Bernhard-Beyer-Straße, was then built on this sliver, allowing Steinstücken residents to cross unimpeded to West Berlin. As the new border enclosed the road on both of its sides, so did the Berlin Wall after East Germany extended it accordingly.

The bridge above the Deutsche Reichsbahn railway tracks, leading to the other half of Steinstücken, caused special problems. East Germany refused to transfer this territory to West Berlin. A compromise was reached in which the bridge and the airspace above it became part of West Berlin, while the airspace and land below the bridge, including the tracks, remained in East German hands. The land transfer and building of the road ended Steinstücken's status as an exclave for all practical purposes.

See also

 Allied Commission
 Berlin Wall
 East Germany
 History of Germany since 1945
 West Berlin
 Zehlendorf
 Wannsee
 Potsdam

References

External links

Map of Steinstücken in 1972 on the official website of the City of Berlin
Berlin Exclaves
Das Kleine Steinstücken und die große Politik (in German)
History of the Western Allies in Berlin
Berlin Television Program Die Insel vor der Insel (in German)
Berlin from the Air - 1969

Zones of Berlin
Steglitz-Zehlendorf
Enclaves and exclaves
Berlin Wall